Mount Olivet Cemetery (usually abbreviated and stylized as Mt. Olivet Cemetery) is a cemetery at 17100 Van Dyke Avenue in the city of Detroit in Wayne County, Michigan. It is owned and operated by the Mt. Elliott Cemetery Association, a not-for-profit Catholic organization that is otherwise administered independently from the Roman Catholic Archdiocese of Detroit and any of the various Catholic religious orders active in Metro Detroit. At , it is the largest cemetery in Detroit, although it no longer promotes itself publicly as a Catholic establishment.

Background
The organizational efforts for a new cemetery to be located at the outskirts of the city and to assist Mt. Elliott Cemetery in its mission to serve Catholic burial needs began in 1881, although it opened earlier than planned due to Detroit's recent population growth and the subsequent rapid acquisition of available burial space at Mt. Elliott—especially that reserved for single graves and poorer families. Named Mt. Olivet Cemetery, it became a "perpetual care" cemetery that ended up opening for interments of Catholics and their families in 1888. It quickly gained a reputation for being the final resting place of choice for many within recent immigrant communities specific to the Detroit area like Flemish Belgians, Germans, Italians, and Poles. By the 1950s, Mt. Olivet had 76 employees and was performing 24 burials per day. In 1987, Mayor Coleman Young and at least three Detroit City Council members explored the idea of acquiring the cemetery to expand the runway for what is now called Coleman A. Young International Airport—and also to reroute 6 Mile Road through it. Families of those interred there expressed outrage and indicated possible legal action (Young had already earned a reputation previously for controversially using eminent domain for economic development purposes in Poletown East). By 1990, there was a noticeable trend by area families to buy burial plots in suburban cemeteries, either out of convenience of location or due to the perception of increased crime within the city limits of Detroit (it is not immediately clear, however, if any of Young's past proposals for Mt. Olivet had had any impact on this). Regardless, by that point, Mt. Olivet had already pre-sold 98% of its available burial space. In 1998, Mt. Olivet ceased promoting itself as grounds designated solely for Catholics and their families.

Present status
A 2008 article by The Detroit News noted that though the cemetery continued to average approximately 1,200 burials per year (a significant number, albeit far fewer than in the 1950s), it also had about 100 annual disinterments—mostly by surviving descendants who were moving their deceased relatives' remains to suburban locations, especially Resurrection Cemetery in Clinton Township (which is also operated by the Mt. Elliott Cemetery Association). The article surmised that while there could possibly be similar movements in other large American cities, it seemed likely to have a particularly pronounced effect with Detroit cemeteries—with Mt. Olivet specifically shouldering the bulk of the disinterments from the city. In addition to gaining newly available burial space from these disinterments, under some circumstances Mt. Olivet also reserves limited rights to reclaim unused spaces that it had previously sold. Also, some spaces that have already hosted single burials may still be used again by certificate holders, if applicable—either for double-depth burials of caskets, or for one casket with up to two urns installed above it.

Special reserved plots
Although the cemetery consists largely of individual burial spaces and family plots, the cemetery does have multiple plots reserved exclusively for members of certain Catholic religious orders—all located in the cemetery's Section 47 with the exception of the Society of the Sacred Heart, which instead retains the rights to plots within Section 45—and a Polish mutual aid veterans' organization, in Section E.

Notable individual interments
The cemetery has 400,000 graves in it, including the remains of numerous famous people. Some of the more heavily-attended graveside services held at Mt. Olivet over the years occurred after polarizing deaths, like those of Wladyslawa "Lottie" Lorenc (in 1923) and Jerry Buckley (who in 1930 was buried just 100 yards away from where his alleged assassin, Thomas Licavoli, would later be interred). Mt. Olivet also hosts three British Commonwealth war graves: one Canadian Royal Air Force cadet and two Canadian soldiers from World War I. In addition, five people who survived the sinking of the Titanic were later laid to rest at Mt. Olivet.

Further reading
 Jensen, Cecile Wendt (2006). Detroit's Mount Olivet Cemetery. Arcadia Publishing. ISBN 978-0-7385-4092-4.

References

External links
 The Political Graveyard
 Mt. Olivet Cemetery - Detroit
 

Cemeteries in Michigan
Roman Catholic cemeteries in Michigan
Geography of Detroit
Protected areas of Wayne County, Michigan
Tourist attractions in Detroit